The Charlotte–Genesee Lighthouse is an 1822 stone octagonal lighthouse in the Charlotte neighborhood in northern Rochester, New York, United States.  The  tower is located on Lake Ontario at the mouth of the Genesee River.  It originally had 10 whale oil Argand lamps, which were replaced with a Fresnel lens in 1853.

On February 28, 1881, the lighthouse was turned off.  After nearby piers changed the mouth of the river, it was far from the water.  The light was then moved to a pier in 1884.

In 1965, Charlotte High School students started a letter writing campaign to save the lighthouse from impending destruction. It was declared surplus in 1981 by the government.  It is now owned by Monroe County and managed as a museum by the Charlotte Genesee Lightouse Historical Society, a nonprofit volunteer organization.

It is part of the Seaway Trail, a National Scenic Byway.  It is listed on the National Register of Historic Places and is also a City of Rochester Landmark.  It is open to the public.

As of 2014, the lighthouse is active, and listed in the United States Coast Guard Light List as light number 2333.

References

Further reading
 Oleszewski, Wes. Great Lakes Lighthouses, American and Canadian: A Comprehensive Directory/Guide to Great Lakes Lighthouses, (Gwinn, Michigan: Avery Color Studios, Inc., 1998) .
 
 U.S. Coast Guard. Historically Famous Lighthouses (Washington, D.C.: Government Printing Office, 1957).
 Wright, Larry and Wright, Patricia. Great Lakes Lighthouses Encyclopedia Hardback (Erin: Boston Mills Press, 2006)

External links

Official Site

Lighthouses completed in 1822
Lighthouses on the National Register of Historic Places in New York (state)
Museums in Rochester, New York
Lighthouse museums in New York (state)
National Register of Historic Places in Rochester, New York
1822 establishments in New York (state)
Transportation buildings and structures in Monroe County, New York
Lighthouses of the Great Lakes